TAEA may refer to:

 Tainan Astronomical Education Area, an educational center in Taiwan
 Tris(2-aminoethyl)amine, an organic compound

See also 
 Asteroid 281569 Taea, named after the educational center